Pu R Roṭhuama is a politician from Mizoram who was a Member of the Parliament of India representing Mizoram in the 6th Lok Sabha and 7th Lok Sabha, the lower house of the Indian Parliament. He was initially a member of the Mizo People's Conference party but he later dissociated himself with the President of the Party Ṭhenphunga Sailo.

References 

India MPs 1980–1984
India MPs 1977–1979
People from Aizawl
Lok Sabha members from Mizoram
Mizo people